Mourir d'aimer (English title: To Die of Love;) is a 1971 Franco-Italian film drama directed by André Cayatte. Based on the true story of Gabrielle Russier [fr], it was the third most popular film of 1971 in France.

Plot 
The time is May 1968. Danièle Guénot, 32 years old and divorced with two children, is a politically engaged French and Latin teacher in Rouen who organises discussion sessions at her home. A 17-year-old student, Gérard Leguen, falls in love with her. She rebuffs him but eventually gives in to the mutual attraction. His parents complain, and she is sent to prison and he to other schools, relatives, and a psychiatric in-patient clinic. She eventually kills herself.

Cast 

 Annie Girardot: Danièle Guénot
 Bruno Pradal: Gérard Leguen
 Claude Cerval: judge
 François Simon: Gérard's father
 Jean-Paul Moulinot: Danièle's father
 Jean Bouise: juvenile justice judge
 Marie-Hélène Breillat [fr]: "The snake" (Danièle's cell mate in prison)
 Monique Mélinand: Gérard's mother
 Yves Barsacq: friend
 Edith Loria: Renée
 Jacques Marin: correspondent
 Raymond Meunier: Danièle's lawyer
 Maurice Nasil [fr]: teacher
 Marcelle Ranson[fr]: neighbour
 André Reybaz: school director
 Mariannik Revillon: Cécile
 Daniel Bellus: Jean-Luc
 Nicolas Dumayet [fr]: Marc
 Bernard Jeantet: Alain
 Nathalie Nell [fr]: Thérèse
 Franck Combeau: child 1
 Frantz Guéroult: child 2
 Claudine Berg [fr]: Mrs. Arnaud
 Florence Blot [fr]: lawyer
 Hélène Dieudonné|fr: blind old woman
 Marius Laurey [fr]: Mr. Arnaud
 Jean Marconi [fr]: clinic director
 Charles Millot: false judge
 Bernard Musson: head of student discipline
 Marcel Pérès (actor) [fr]: grandfather
 Clément Thierry : Danièle's ex-husband
 Roger Trapp [fr]: school monitor
 Marthe Villalonga: social worker
 Jacky Blanchot [fr]: inspector (uncredited) 
 Marcel Gassouk [fr] prison employee (uncredited)
 Jean Minisini [fr]: nurse (uncredited)
 Yves Gavard-Perret: pupil who helps Gérard (uncredited)

Background and production
The film is based on the story of Gabrielle Russier, a 32-year-old divorced French teacher in Marseille who killed herself on 1 September 1969 after being found guilty of corruption of a minor. It was largely shot at Mont-Saint-Aignan and Rouen, with some scenes being filmed at Cluses.

Music
The score is by Louiguy. The song "Mourir d'aimer" by Charles Aznavour was also inspired by Russier's story and appeared before the film, at the beginning of 1971, but Louiguy did not allow it to be used in the French soundtrack; it was included in some non-French releases, including the Italian and the American. It was also represented as "inspired by the film" on 45 rpm singles that appeared soon afterwards. The version used on the Italian soundtrack won a Golden Lion at the 1971 Venice Film Festival.

The song "De terciopelo negro" (black fur) by the Ecuadorian Jorge Araujo Chiriboga recurs several times in the film, performed by Carmela, with Paco Ibañez on guitar. It and "Partida" (Parting) were issued as singles.

Reception
The film was a success; 5,912,404 tickets were sold in France, making it the third most popular film of the year. Annie Girardot's performance as Danièle was particularly praised. The reviewer for The New York Times praised the performances and wrote that the film "delves deeply and often movingly into the states of mind of both the obdurate lawmakers and the tragic principals."

Awards 
 1971: 
 1972: Nominee for Golden Globe Award for Best Foreign Language Film

References

External links 
 

French films based on actual events
Films à clef
French drama films
Italian drama films
Films directed by André Cayatte
Films about suicide
1971 films
Films about scandalous teacher–student relationships
1970s Italian films
1970s French films
1970s French-language films
French-language Italian films